Michal Filo (born 28 February 1984) is a Slovak footballer, who currently plays as a striker for TJ Družstevník Vrakúň.

External links 
 

1984 births
Living people
Slovak footballers
FK Dubnica players
FK Dukla Banská Bystrica players
FC DAC 1904 Dunajská Streda players
Slovak Super Liga players
Slovakia international footballers

Association football forwards
People from Dubnica nad Váhom
Sportspeople from the Trenčín Region